The Women's 200 metre individual medley SM8 swimming event at the 2004 Summer Paralympics was competed on 23 September. It was won by Dóra Pásztory, representing .

1st round

Heat 1
23 Sept. 2004, morning session

Heat 2
23 Sept. 2004, morning session

Final round

23 Sept. 2004, evening session

References

W
2004 in women's swimming